Renewal is the collective term for Charismatic, Pentecostal and Neo-charismatic churches.

Neo-charismatic churches 
The neo-charismatic denominations have more than a million members in China,. In Vietnam the Montagnard Evangelical Church is one of the largest Christian denominations.

Pentecostal churches 
In Myanmar, the Assemblies of God of Myanmar is one of the largest Christian denominations. The pentecostal churches 
Igreja do Evangelho Completo de Deus, Assembleias de Deus, 
and the Assembleias Evangelicas de Deus Pentecostales are among the largest denominations of Mozambique. Indonesia has the pentecostal church Gereja Pantekosta di Indonesia.  Nigeria has the Assemblies of God and the Church of the Lord (Aladura).

Renewal churches 
Apostolic Church of Pentecost
Apostolic Pentecostal Church
Assemblies of Christ Church
Assemblies of God
Association of Vineyard Churches
Believers' Churches in India
Bible Brethren Fellowship
Bible Christian Mission
Bible Pattern Church
Blessing Youth Mission
Christian Fellowship Centre
Church of God of Prophecy
Church of God (Full Gospel) in India
Church of the Apostolic Faith
Elim Church
Eternal Light Ministries
Fellowship of Evangelical Friends
Fellowship of Gospel Churches
Filadelfia Fellowship
Gospel Echoing Missionary Society
International Church of the Foursquare Gospel
Nagaland Christian Revival Church
Native Missionary Movement
New Life Churches
New Life Fellowship Association
New Life Outreach
New Testament Church of India,
Open Bible Church of God
Orissa Missionary Movement
Pentecostal Free Will Baptist Church
Pentecostal Holiness Church
Pentecostal Mission
Prince of Peace Church
Rajasthan Bible Institute
Reaching Indians Ministries
Tamil Christian Fellowship
United Pentecostal Church in India

See also
Born Again Movement
Church renewal
Pentecostal Charismatic Peace Fellowship
Renewal theologian

References

Sources 
World Christian Encyclopedia. 2001. (2nd ed.) Oxford University Press.
Burgess, Stanley M. (ed.) The New International Dictionary of Pentecostal and Charismatic Movements. Grand Rapids: Zondervan.

Charismatic and Pentecostal Christianity

de:Renewal